LanguageWire A/S is a Danish technology company and language service provider headquartered in Frederiksberg, Denmark. Founded in 2000, LanguageWire is primarily used as a translation management system (TMS) for businesses. According to the Common Sense Advisory study, The Largest Language Service Providers: 2019, LanguageWire is the 23rd largest language service provider globally with a revenue of 71.32 million USD. As of October 2018, LanguageWire has been majority owned by CataCap, a Danish private equity fund.

Products

LanguageWire Content Platform 
The core of LanguageWire's business is a proprietary platform which facilitates the outsourcing of content production, including quoting, direct integration with digital platforms, translation tools, billing, and invoicing.

History

LanguageWire was founded in 2000 by Anders Philipsen, Thor Angelo, and Henrik Lottrup.

In May 2017, LanguageWire was purchased by CataCap, a Danish private equity fund. On March 19, 2018, LanguageWire acquired Frontlab, a software company that improves Adobe InDesign workflows. Over a year later on October 31, 2018, LanguageWire acquired Xplanation, a Belgian competitor, more than doubling the size of the company.

On June 11, 2020, Søren Bech Justesen became CEO of LanguageWire, being promoted from his previous position of CFO. He replaced Henrik Lottrup, who had founded the company in 2000 and moved into a board member and advisory role.

See also 

 vidby
 DeeplL

References

Companies based in Frederiksberg Municipality
Danish companies established in 2000
Service companies of Denmark
Translation companies
Translation software
Technology companies of Denmark